Vazetje Sigeta grada (English: The Taking of the City of Siget) is the first Croatian historical epic written between 1568 and 1572 by Brne Karnarutić and published posthumously in 1584. The epic poem deals with the 1566 defense of Siget by Nikola Šubić Zrinski, based on the writing of his valet, Franjo Črnko.

Contents

Composition and themes
The overall impression is based on opposition of Christian and "un-Christian", which is associated with just and unjust. The epic is described as twenty pages long, divided in four sections, and is written in doubly-rhymed dodecasyllable.

Summary
The first section of the epic is devoted to introducing Nikola Zrinski, Sultan Suleiman and the besieging Ottoman army. The second section describes the preparation of the Ottomans for an attack, with the third dealing with the final battle. The last section mentions the death of Suleiman, with the final charge led by Mehmed Paša Sokolović. This leads to the death and burial of Nikola Zrinski.

Publication history
1st edition, 1584, Venice
2nd edition, 1639, Venice
3nd edition, 1661, Venice (by Fordoci)
4th edition, 1866, Zagreb (by Ljudevit Gaj)

See also
The Siege of Sziget

References

External links

Vazetje sigeta grada, by Karnarutić on Matica hrvatska
Biography of Franjo Črnko

Epic poems
Historical poems
Croatian poems
16th-century poems
Cultural depictions of Hungarian men
Cultural depictions of Croatian men
Cultural depictions of military officers